Alice to Nowhere is a 1986 Australian miniseries set in the outback in 1954. The title refers to Alice, the name given to the Mailman's truck. The plot involves a nurse and a pair of ruthless jewel thieves.

The show enjoyed reasonable ratings when it aired.

References

External links
 
 Alice to Nowhere at the National Film and Sound Archive
Alice to Nowhere – Crawfords Australia

1986 films
1986 drama films
Australian drama films
Television series set in 1954
Television shows set in the Northern Territory
Television shows set in South Australia
1980s English-language films
Films directed by John Power
1980s Australian films